The women's 400 metres event at the 1999 Summer Universiade was held on 9, 10 and 12 July at the Estadio Son Moix in Palma de Mallorca, Spain.

Medalists

Results

Heats

Semifinals

Final

References

Athletics at the 1999 Summer Universiade
1999 in women's athletics
1999